Celestin Augustin is a Malagasy Olympic boxer. He represented his country in the flyweight division at the 2000 Summer Olympics. He lost in his first bout to Polish boxer Andrzej Rżany.

References

External links
 

1971 births
Living people
Malagasy male boxers
Olympic boxers of Madagascar
Boxers at the 2000 Summer Olympics
African Games gold medalists for Madagascar
African Games medalists in boxing
Competitors at the 1999 All-Africa Games
Flyweight boxers